The 1994 Slick 50 500 was the 30th and penultimate stock car race of the 1994 NASCAR Winston Cup Series season, the 13th and penultimate race of the 1994 NASCAR Winston West Series, and the seventh iteration of the event. The race was held on Sunday, October 30, 1994, before an audience of 96,000 in Avondale, Arizona at Phoenix International Raceway, a 1-mile (1.6 km) permanent low-banked tri-oval race track. The race took the scheduled 312 laps to complete. At race's end, Hendrick Motorsports driver Terry Labonte would manage to dominate the late stages of the race to take his 14th career NASCAR Winston Cup Series victory and his third and final victory of the season. To fill out the top three, Roush Racing driver Mark Martin and Morgan–McClure Motorsports driver Sterling Marlin would finish second and third, respectively.

Background 

Phoenix International Raceway – also known as PIR – is a one-mile, low-banked tri-oval race track located in Avondale, Arizona. It is named after the nearby metropolitan area of Phoenix. The motorsport track opened in 1964 and currently hosts two NASCAR race weekends annually. PIR has also hosted the IndyCar Series, CART, USAC and the Rolex Sports Car Series. The raceway is currently owned and operated by International Speedway Corporation.

The raceway was originally constructed with a 2.5 mi (4.0 km) road course that ran both inside and outside of the main tri-oval. In 1991 the track was reconfigured with the current 1.51 mi (2.43 km) interior layout. PIR has an estimated grandstand seating capacity of around 67,000. Lights were installed around the track in 2004 following the addition of a second annual NASCAR race weekend.

Entry list 

 (R) denotes rookie driver.

Qualifying 
Qualifying was split into two rounds. The first round was held on Friday, October 28, at 6:00 PM EST. Each driver would have one lap to set a time. During the first round, the top 20 drivers in the round would be guaranteed a starting spot in the race. If a driver was not able to guarantee a spot in the first round, they had the option to scrub their time from the first round and try and run a faster lap time in a second round qualifying run, held on Saturday, October 29, at 4:00 PM EST. As with the first round, each driver would have one lap to set a time. For this specific race, positions 21-40 would be decided on time, and depending on who needed it, a select amount of positions were given to cars who had not otherwise qualified but were high enough in owner's points; which was two for cars in the NASCAR Winston Cup Series and one extra provisional for the NASCAR Winston West Series.  If needed, a past champion who did not qualify on either time or provisionals could use a champion's provisional, adding one more spot to the field.

11 drivers would fail to qualify.

Full qualifying results

Race results

Standings after the race 

Drivers' Championship standings

Note: Only the first 10 positions are included for the driver standings.

References

Slick 50 500
Slick 50 500
NASCAR races at Phoenix Raceway
October 1994 sports events in the United States